Wan Quan (1495–1585), also known as Wan Mizhai, was a Ming dynasty pediatrician. He was the third in his family to practice medicine. He advocated that children be frequently exposed to sunlight and fresh air and trained to resist cold. He also believed that frightening a child was harmful to him or her, as was overfeeding or overmedicating. Wan was the first individual to have written about variolation, an early smallpox vaccination technique, in his treatise Douzhen Xinfa (痘疹心法), published in 1549.

References

External links
 http://www.itmonline.org/arts/rehm6.htm
 http://clearharmony.net/articles/200305/12085.html

1495 births
1585 deaths
Ming dynasty writers
16th-century Chinese physicians
People from Huanggang
Writers from Hubei
Physicians from Hubei
Chinese non-fiction writers